Hypocalymma verticillare is a member of the family Myrtaceae endemic to Western Australia.

The shrub is found in a small area on the boundary of the South West and Great Southern regions of Western Australia in an area between Manjimup and Denmark.

References

verticillare
Endemic flora of Western Australia
Rosids of Western Australia
Endangered flora of Australia
Plants described in 2013
Taxa named by Barbara Lynette Rye